Samborondón Canton is a canton of Ecuador, located in the Guayas Province.  Its capital is the town of Samborondón.  Its population at the 2001 census was 45,476.

Demographics
Ethnic groups as of the Ecuadorian census of 2010:
Mestizo  48.7%
Montubio  25.7%
White  19.6%
Afro-Ecuadorian  3.6%
Indigenous  0.4%
Other  0.7%

References

Cantons of Guayas Province